The Ladies' Alpine Club was founded in London in 1907 and was the first mountaineering club for women. It merged with the Alpine Club of Great Britain in 1975.

History

In December 1907 a group of ladies who were climbers in the Alps met in London and agreed to form a new club, similar to the long-established Alpine Club, which at the time did not accept women members on account of their supposed physical and moral deficiencies in the matter of mountain climbing.  The club's first president was the Bishop of Bristol, the second was Elizabeth Le Blond in 1908, who had been praised by T. G. Bonney when he became president of the Alpine Club as one of those "whom our stern Salic law prevents us from numbering among our members", and it was the first club specifically for women mountaineers. Initially, it was the Alpine Section of the Lyceum Club, an intellectual women's club, to which Elizabeth Le Blond belonged, but in 1908 it established an independent existence. The club had its base at the Great Central Hotel, Marylebone,
but was seen as affiliated to the Alpine Club and junior to it.

As well as arranging climbing expeditions, the Ladies' Alpine Club organised a monthly lecture and provided rooms where members could meet for tea. For the duration of the First World War, the club's rooms were taken over by the War Department, but they were restored in 1919. The Alpine Club itself was at first sceptical about the Ladies' Club, but it soon began to take it seriously and to co-operate with it, especially after Queen Margherita of Italy accepted the position of Honorary President. According to Ann Bridge, a friend and climbing partner of George Mallory, the Ladies' Club held an annual dinner at the Great Central Hotel:

At the first such annual dinner, on 7 December 1908, the President of the Alpine Club, Herman Woolley, spoke supportively of the new organisation and noted that ladies could make "ascents of the very first order". A former president of the Alpine Club then added that in his time he had wanted to admit women to membership, and indeed had found that a majority of other members supported this, but he had decided not to force the issue on an "unwilling minority".
 
Despite this apparent rapprochement, a certain animus towards women climbers from their colleagues in the senior club remained for many years. Ellen Pigeon stated: "In days gone by many A.C.s refused to speak to us," and one of the leading women climbers of the age, the American Fanny Bullock Workman, found male mountaineers in Britain to be less than friendly to her.  In his obituary of Workman, Captain J. P. Farrar remarked:

In 1921 a rival organisation called the Pinnacle Club was founded by the wives of two members of the Climbers' Club. When the British Mountaineering Council was constituted in 1945, both clubs for women, the Ladies' Alpine Club and the Pinnacle Club, were represented on its committee.

Merger with Alpine Club
The Alpine Club had long resisted admitting women members, and in 1973 an attempt to have this policy reversed was defeated, the necessary two-thirds majority not being achieved. In May 1974, however, another vote was held and, despite the continued opposition of the influential Bill Tilman, women were at last allowed to join the club. This made the existence of a separate women's club unnecessary, and in 1975 the Ladies' Alpine Club merged with the Alpine Club, the latter gaining 150 new members. The merger was not universally popular, and 37 women resigned in protest in 1975 or soon thereafter, including Joyce Dunsheath, Miriam Underhill and Monica Jackson. The first two women to be elected to membership of the Alpine Club in their own right were Sally Westmacott, wife of Mike Westmacott, who had been on the 1953 Everest expedition, and Betty Seifert.

Ladies' Alpine Club Journal
Between 1920 and 1975 the club issued a yearbook, which was absorbed into the Alpine Journal on the merger of the two clubs. Until 1960 the title of the yearbook was simply Ladies Alpine Club, then from 1961 to 1975 it was called Ladies Alpine Club Journal. All issues were indexed in 2000 by Johanna Merz, former editor of the Alpine Journal.

Presidents
1907–1913: Mrs Aubrey Le Blond (1860–1934)
1913–1916: Lucy Walker (1836–1916)
Margaret Meyer (1862–1924)
1957: Una Cameron (1904–1987)

Notable members
Anna Pigeon (1832–1917), vice-president from 1910
Margaret Lorimer (1866–1954), New Zealand member
Nea Morin (1905–1986)
Phyllis Munday (1894–1990), created honorary member in 1936

See also
List of alpine clubs

References

Further reading
Johanna Merz, Index to Ladies' Alpine Club Year-books, 1910–1975 (Alpine Club, 2000)

External links
Club expedition reports#495 Ladies Alpine Club Minute Books at nationalarchives.gov.uk

Women's clubs
1907 establishments in the United Kingdom
Alpine Club (UK)
Climbing organizations
Climbing clubs in the United Kingdom
Alpine clubs
Sports organizations established in 1907
Mountaineering in the United Kingdom
Women in London
History of women in the United Kingdom
Female climbers